The David Citadel Hotel is a luxury hotel on King David Street in Jerusalem, across the street from the Mamilla Mall. It has hosted VIPs, global political leaders, business moguls and celebrities, competing with the nearby King David Hotel and the new Waldorf Astoria for the title of "Jerusalem's flagship hotel".

History
The hotel opened in 1998 as the "Hilton Jerusalem", managed as it was originally by Hilton International. After a business dispute in 2001 between Hilton and Alfred Akirov, managing director of the Tel Aviv-based Alrov hotel and real estate development group, which involved multimillion-dollar lawsuits between the two corporations, Hilton pulled out of managing the property. The hotel, renamed the David Citadel Hotel, is currently owned by Akirov and managed by the Alrov Hotel Group, which controls five luxury properties in Jerusalem, Amsterdam, London and Paris.

People who have stayed at the hotel include U.S. President Bill Clinton and his wife Hillary Clinton, Senator Barack Obama, Senator John McCain, Russian Prime Minister Vladimir Putin and U.S. Secretary of State Condoleezza Rice, who has used the facility to conduct quiet meetings between  Israeli and Palestinian peace negotiating teams.

Design and style

The hotel, along with the Mamilla development project across the street, was designed by Moshe Safdie as a U-shaped structure rising 10 stories high with 384 rooms and suites. It has terrace-style suites that overlook the Old City of Jerusalem and the Tower of David. A glass-domed public lobby in the inner part of the "U" was designed by Piero Lissoni. The building sports a neo-Oriental style which blends Middle-Eastern and classic Jerusalem architectural elements.

References

External links

Hotels in Jerusalem
Mamilla
Hotels established in 1998
Hotel buildings completed in 1998
1998 establishments in Israel
Moshe Safdie buildings